Namir (born January 20, 1988) is an Iraqi singer, composer and songwriter.

Discography

Studio albums 
2011: ma beladna
2015: moh aroh
2016: la elia 
2016: kader'
2017: malak
2017: rawini
2017: kli aelak

Live albums 
2017: la elia
2017: kli aelak

References 

Living people
1986 births
Musicians from Baghdad
21st-century Iraqi male singers
Iraqi male singer-songwriters